Simbi is a mizik rasin band formed in 1987.  The name of the band comes from the name for a family of vodou loa, or gods, called the simbi.

History
The members of Simbi are all Swedish, but the music they perform is inspired by the Haitian vodou roots music movement known as mizik rasin. The band is known by their Haitian fans as the "Blue-Eyed Haitians".

Discography

References

Haitian musical groups
Swedish musical groups